The ladder-backed woodpecker (Dryobates scalaris) is a North American woodpecker.

Description

The ladder-backed woodpecker is a small woodpecker about 16.5 to 19 cm (6½ to 7½ inches) in length. It is primarily colored black and white, with a barred pattern on its back and wings resembling the rungs of a ladder. Its rump is speckled with black, as are its cream-colored underparts on the breast and flanks.  Southern populations have duskier buff breasts and distinctly smaller bills. Adult males have a red crown patch that is smaller in immatures and lacking in adult females. The ladder-backed woodpecker is very similar in appearance to Nuttall's woodpecker, but has much less black on its head and upper back, and the range of the two species only intersects a minimal amount in southern California and northern Baja California.  Hybrids are known.

Ladder-backed woodpeckers nest in cavities excavated from tree trunks, or in more arid environments a large cactus will do. The female lays between 2 and 7 eggs, which are plain white. The eggs are incubated by both sexes, but the nesting period and other details are unknown.

Like most other woodpeckers the ladder-backed woodpecker bores into tree-trunks with its chisel-like bill to hunt for insects and their larva, but it also feeds on fruit produced by cacti.

Range and habitat
The ladder-backed woodpecker is fairly common in dry brushy areas and thickets and has a rather large range. The species can be found year-round over the southwestern United States (north to extreme southern Nevada and extreme southeastern Colorado), most of Mexico, and locally in Central America as far south as Nicaragua.

References

External links

  Ladder-backed woodpecker, a bibliographic resource

Dryobates
Native birds of the Southwestern United States
Birds of Mexico
Birds of the Sierra Madre Occidental
Birds of the Sierra Madre Oriental
Birds of the Sierra Madre del Sur
Birds of the Trans-Mexican Volcanic Belt
Birds of the Yucatán Peninsula
Birds of Central America
Birds described in 1829
Taxa named by Johann Georg Wagler